Olufsen is a surname. Notable people with the surname include:

Bernt Olufsen (born 1954), Norwegian newspaper editor
Christian Olufsen (1802–1855), Danish astronomer
Joachim Olufsen (born 1995), Norwegian footballer 
Jørgen Olufsen, Danish politician
Ole Olufsen (1865–1929), Danish military officer and explorer
Svend Olufsen (1897-1949), Danish electrical engineer